Borgerliga Studenter – Opposition '68 is a centre-right political fraction of the compulsory student union at Stockholm University, created in 1968 as a reaction against the leftist student uprisings earlier the same year. Among its leading members have been Carl Bildt and Fredrik Reinfeldt, who both later would become Swedish prime ministers.

Student political organizations
Stockholm University
1968 establishments in Sweden
Student organizations established in 1968